Monica Green (born 1959), is a Swedish Social Democratic politician who has been a member of the Riksdag from 1994 to 2018. A controversial thought that she has expressed is that incest between adults should be legalised.

References

External links
Monica Green at the Riksdag website
Green's blog (inactive)

1959 births
Living people
Members of the Riksdag from the Social Democrats
Swedish bloggers
Women members of the Riksdag
Swedish women bloggers
Members of the Riksdag 2002–2006
21st-century Swedish women politicians